Kalocyrma is a genus of moth in the family Lecithoceridae.

Species
 Kalocyrma curota Wu, 1994
 Kalocyrma decurtata Wu, 1994
 Kalocyrma echita Wu, 1994
 Kalocyrma epileuca Wu & Park, 1999
 Kalocyrma oxygonia Wu & Park, 1999

References

Natural History Museum Lepidoptera genus database

 
Lecithocerinae
Moth genera